The American Beauty is a lost 1916 American silent drama film directed by William Desmond Taylor and starring Myrtle Stedman.

Cast
Myrtle Stedman - Ruth Cleave, Mrs. Marin Ellsworth
Elliott Dexter - Paul Keith
Howard Davies - Herbert Lorrimer
Jack Livingston - Martin Ellsworth
Adelaide Woods - Mrs. Cleave
Edward Ayers - Cleave

References

External links

 
AllMovie; synopsis

1916 films
American silent feature films
Lost American films
Films directed by William Desmond Taylor
Paramount Pictures films
1916 drama films
1916 lost films
American black-and-white films
Silent American drama films
Lost drama films
1910s American films